Kwon Mina (born September 21, 1993) mononymously known as Mina, is a South Korean singer and actress. She is best known as a former member of the girl group AOA. Kwon has acted in television dramas, including Modern Farmer (2014) and All About My Mom (2015).

Early life
Kwon was born on September 21, 1993, in Busan, South Korea. She auditioned for FNC in 2009, and her family moved from Busan to Seoul soon after.

Career

2012–2014: Debut with AOA and solo activities

On July 30, 2012, Kwon made her debut as a member of AOA on Mnet's M Countdown with the song "Elvis" from their debut single album, Angels' Story. She was also part of band unit AOA Black, established in 2013. Due to her father's death on November 29, 2014, Kwon took some time off from career activities and did not participate in some promotions for "Like a Cat".

In 2013, Kwon debuted as an actress with the KBS2 drama special Adolescence Medley, where she played Yoon Jin-yeong. In February 2014, she played the younger role of Kim Hee-sun's character, Cha Hye-won, in the KBS drama Wonderful Days. Kwon had her first lead role in the SBS weekend drama Modern Farmer, which aired from October to December 2014.

2015–2017: Continued solo activities
On February 26, 2015, Kwon appeared in the music video for solo singer Shade's song "Bad". In May, Kwon made her debut as an MC with Y-Star's variety show Gourmet Road. In August, she was appointed as co-MC on Weekly Idol with Apink's Hayoung and VIXX's N, starting from September 2. On September 9, Kwon and Nam Joo-hyuk appeared in the music video for solo singer Kangnam's song "Chocolate". On December 5, she joined the cast of the KBS weekend drama All About My Mom, starting from episode 33. She played Go Aeng-doo, a pretty and innocent, yet mysterious young lady.

In March 2016, Kwon starred in the seven-part web drama Click Your Heart, produced by her agency FNC Entertainment, where she played a cheerful, but clumsy, 18-year-old high school student who forms friendships and love triangles with four boys. In 2017, she has been cast in the remake of 1986's horror movie Woman's Wail, and in the hospital drama Hospital Ship as a nurse. She compiled an essay collection of quotes and wisdom that are personally meaningful to her titled Stars Don't Lose Their Way at Night that was published on November 1, 2017.

Kwon won the Hallyu Star Award at the 10th Korea Drama Awards for her role in Hospital Ship.

2018–present: Continued success, departure from AOA and new agencies
In February 2018, it was revealed that Kwon will also join the cast of KBS weekday drama Queen of Mystery 2 as police officer Shin Na-ra. The same year, she was cast in the web drama Wind-Bell and in Loss Time Life, the remake of a Japanese drama of the same name.

On May 13, 2019, Kwon left AOA after deciding not to renew her contract with FNC Entertainment.

On July 1, 2019, it was announced that Kwon had signed with O& Entertainment.

In 2020, she left O& Entertainment and signed with Woori Actors.
On September 26, 2020, Kwon left the agency.

Personal life

Bullying allegations against Jimin
On July 3, 2020, Kwon alleged in an Instagram post that AOA member Shin Ji-min had bullied her for a decade, which led to her withdrawal from the group in 2019. She posted a photo of her scarred wrist and claimed to have attempted suicide as a result of the bullying. Shin reportedly responded to the accusations by posting the word "fiction" to her Instagram Stories before deleting it shortly after. Kwon criticized the post, stating, "Fiction? It's too scary to say it's fiction." On July 4, Shin posted an apology to her Instagram page while FNC Entertainment released a statement announcing that she had been removed from AOA and would be halting all entertainment activities.

Mental health issues
On August 6, 2020, Kwon posted a photograph on Instagram with the caption "Jinri-ya, I miss you", which was believed to be a reference to Sulli (Choi Jin-ri) of f(x), who committed suicide in 2019. In a separate post, Kwon revealed that she had recently been hospitalized after a relapse in self harm, following a KakaoTalk conversation she had with an FNC Entertainment representative who believed Shin's apology to be sincere. She expressed anger at the possibility of Shin resuming activities and finished the post by begging the company to be more considerate of their artists.  Two days later, in a since-deleted Instagram post, Kwon shared a graphic image of her slit wrist accompanied by an apparent suicide note stating:

Her agency officials notified authorities immediately upon seeing the post and she was transported to the hospital in non-life-threatening condition. At the end of October Kwon left the agency and went on a career hiatus to focus on her recovery.

Discography

Filmography

Television series

Reality show

Variety show

Music video appearances

Awards and nominations

References

External links 

 
 

AOA (group) members
1993 births
Living people
K-pop singers
South Korean female idols
South Korean women pop singers
People from Busan
FNC Entertainment artists
South Korean television personalities
South Korean dance musicians
South Korean television actresses
South Korean rhythm and blues singers
Japanese-language singers of South Korea
Mandarin-language singers of South Korea
Weekly Idol members